Thomas Whitehead  (1787–1859) was a prominent business man in Rawtenstall, Lancashire. With David and Peter established Thomas Whitehead and Brothers in 1815.

He is buried in the same grave as his two brothers in the churchyard of Longholme Methodist Church.

References

1787 births
1859 deaths
People from Rawtenstall